Ana Karina Manco Guzmán (born 17 December 1967) is a Venezuelan actress known for her various roles in telenovelas and theatre.

Biography
Ana is the youngest of three older siblings, her sister Giannina and brothers Frollo and Freddy. She graduated from Law School at the Universidad Santa María.

She began her acting career at the age of 13 by landing a role as the co-protagonist in the RCTV telenovela La mujer sin rostro.

In 2010, she returned to telenovelas to play the villain in the telenovela La mujer perfecta written by Leonardo Padrón

Personal life
On 23 May 2002, Manco married businessman Vicente Perez Recao. They received their first son Dimitri Nicolás. In 2012, the actress announced via Twitter that she was expecting a second child. On April 2, 2013, Ana gave birth to her second child, a daughter named Alexa Model Agency Mariela Centeno

Filmography

Telenovelas
 La mujer perfecta (2010) as Gala Moncada Montiel de Reveron
 Aunque mal paguen (2007) as Catalina Quiroz
 Sabor a ti (2004) as Miranda Valladares
 Amantes de Luna Llena (2001) as La Chocolate
 El País de las mujeres (1998) as Mariana Campos Gómez
 Contra Viento y Marea (1997) as Daniela Borges
 Sol de Tentación (1996) as Sandra Nionegro
 Amores de Fin de Siglo (1995) as Constanza
 El Desprecio (1991) as Tamara Campos
 Por Estas Calles 
 Carmen Querida
 La mujer sin rostro

Theater
 La Fierecilla Domada
 María Lionza
 La Mozuela

References

External links

1970 births
Living people
Venezuelan stage actresses
Venezuelan telenovela actresses
Actresses from Caracas